Sudden Death or Sudden death may refer to:

Medical
 Cardiac arrest, also known as sudden cardiac death, natural death from cardiac causes
 Sudden cardiac death of athletes
 Sudden infant death syndrome
 Sudden unexpected death in epilepsy
Sudden arrhythmic death syndrome, a sudden unexpected death mainly during sleep

Sports 

 Sudden death (sport), a form of competition where play ends as soon as one competitor is ahead of the others
 1958 NFL Championship Game, nicknamed "Sudden Death" for its dramatic ending

Arts and entertainment

Film and television 
 Sudden Death (1977 film), a Philippine action film
 Sudden Death (1995 film), an American action film starring Jean-Claude Van Damme
 "Sudden Death" (CSI: Miami), a 2010 television episode
 "Sudden Death" (Hit the Floor), a 2014 television episode
 "Sudden Death" (Murder, She Wrote), a 1985 television episode
 Sudden Death, the main antagonist of NFL Rush Zone seasons 1 and 3
 Died Suddenly (2022 film), an online anti-vaccination propaganda film

Music 
 Sudden Death (band), an American comedy rap group
 Svdden Death, American DJ and producer
 Sudden Death Records, a Canadian record label
 "Sudden Death" (song), by Megadeth, 2010
 "Sudden Death", a song by Bathory from Destroyer of Worlds, 2001

Literature
 Sudden Death (novel), a 1932 novel by Freeman Wills Crofts

Other
Sudden death syndrome, a disease in soybean plants
 Blair's Sudden Death Sauce, a very hot sauce for food